Royal Air Force Clyffe Pypard or more simply RAF Clyffe Pypard is a former Royal Air Force satellite airfield located in Wiltshire.

History

No. 29 Elementary Flying Training School RAF was formed here on 13 September 1941 and operated a variety of aircraft including Fairey Battles, Miles Magisters, Avro Ansons and de Havilland Tiger Moths. The school was disbanded on 5 November 1947 and absorbed by No. 21 Elementary Flying Training School RAF.

Current use

The site has now been returned to Farmland.

References

Citations

Bibliography

Royal Air Force stations in Wiltshire
Military units and formations established in 1941